Peter Babnič (born 30 April 1977 in Brezno) is a Slovak former football player.

Babnič played for several clubs in Slovakia before moving to the Czech Republic to play for Sparta Prague in 2001. He also played for Tescoma Zlín and Sigma Olomouc before returning to Slovakia in 2006. He won the Slovak championship with Inter Bratislava in 2000 and 2001 seasons.

International career

International goal
Score and result list Slovakia's goal tally first.

External links
 
 

1977 births
Living people
Sportspeople from Brezno
Slovak footballers
Slovakia international footballers
Slovakia under-21 international footballers
FK Inter Bratislava players
SK Sigma Olomouc players
AC Sparta Prague players
FC Fastav Zlín players
Dyskobolia Grodzisk Wielkopolski players
Slovak Super Liga players
Czech First League players
Ekstraklasa players
Slovak expatriate footballers
Expatriate footballers in the Czech Republic
Expatriate footballers in Poland
Association football forwards
FK Dukla Banská Bystrica players
MFK Ružomberok players
FC Senec players